Bridge (also known as The Bridge) is a 1949 Chinese war film made shortly after the Chinese Communist Revolution; as such, it is considered the first feature film completed after the founding of the People's Republic of China. As a film, Bridge set many of the themes that would dominate the Socialist cinema of post-1949 China, including the glorification of the worker and the conversion of the intellectual to Communism.

Plot
During the Chinese Civil War, a railroad factory is commissioned by the People's Liberation Army to repair a bridge. Led by a skeptical engineer who does not believe the bridge can be completed in time, the factory workers lack enthusiasm and morale. The project is galvanized, however, by the work of Liang Ruisheng (Wang Jiayi), who inspires his fellow workers to complete the project for the war effort. In the process, even the engineer is converted.

References

Sources
Berry, Chris. Postsocialist cinema in post-Mao China: the cultural revolution after the cultural revolution. Routledge (2004). .
Zhang, Yingjin. Chinese national cinema. Routledge (2004). .

External links
 
 Bridge at the Chinese Movie Database

1949 films
1940s Mandarin-language films
1940s war drama films
Chinese black-and-white films
Chinese war drama films
1949 drama films